Eva Trevisan (born 21 April 1980 in Gorizia) is an Italian softball player.

Biography
Eva Trevisan has a participation in the Olympic Games in Athens 2004. She's the captain of the Italy women's national softball team.

Palmarès
3 wins at the ESF Women's Championship,  (1997, 2001, 2003)
4 wins at the ESF European Cup Women,  (1999, 2000, 2001, 2015)

References

External links

Italian softball players
1980 births
Living people
People from Gorizia
Olympic softball players of Italy
Softball players at the 2004 Summer Olympics
Sportspeople from Friuli-Venezia Giulia